Chan Pak Hang (born 21 November 1992) is a former Hong Kong professional footballer.

Club career

South China
In July 2011, Chan was promoted from the reserves to the first team. He also wore the number 26 during the 2011–2012 season .

Chan played his debut game for South China on 22 October 2011, playing against Sapling at Mong Kok Stadium.

Pegasus
Chan joined Pegasus on a season-long loan.

On 6 October 2016, Chan was one of six current and former Pegasus players to be taken in for questioning by the ICAC on allegations of match fixing.  He was formally charged on 28 June 2017 for conspiracy to defraud and offering an advantage to an agent. Chan allegedly offered HKD $20,000 bribes to two separate players to fix a reserve league match in March 2016.

On 19 April 2018, Chan was found not guilty of conspiracy to defraud after the judge ruled that he could not convict him beyond a reasonable doubt.

Yuen Long
On 15 July 2018, Chan was unveiled as a Yuen Long player, resuming his career after two years away from the game.

Pegasus
On 8 July 2019, Chan returned to Pegasus, signing a one year contract.

Career statistics

Club
As of 11 May 2013

International

Hong Kong U-23
As of 3 July 2012

References

External links
 

1992 births
Living people
Association football defenders
Hong Kong footballers
Hong Kong First Division League players
Hong Kong Premier League players
South China AA players
TSW Pegasus FC players
Yuen Long FC players
Footballers at the 2014 Asian Games
Asian Games competitors for Hong Kong